The Bridget Smith House is a historic home that housed Irish immigrant families. It is located at 124 Randolph Avenue in Mine Hill Township, New Jersey and is part of the New Jersey Women's Heritage Trail. It was added to the National Register of Historic Places on February 27, 1998.

See also
National Register of Historic Places listings in Morris County, New Jersey

References

Mine Hill Township, New Jersey
Houses in Morris County, New Jersey
National Register of Historic Places in Morris County, New Jersey
Georgian architecture in New Jersey